Ideciu de Jos is a commune in Mureș County, Transylvania, Romania. It is composed of three villages: Deleni (Oroszidecs), Ideciu de Jos and Ideciu de Sus (Felsőidecs).

See also
List of Hungarian exonyms (Mureș County)

References

Communes in Mureș County
Localities in Transylvania